Abgar de Castro Araújo Renault (1901-1995) was a Brazilian professor, educator, politician, poet, essayist and translator.

He was born in Barbacena in Minas Gerais on April 15, 1901. He was the son of Léon Renault and Maria José de Castro Renault. He attended school in Belo Horizonte, where he began teaching. He was a professor at the Ginásio Mineiro de Belo Horizonte, at the Federal University of Minas Gerais and, in Rio de Janeiro, at Colégio Pedro II and at the University of the Federal District. He was elected state deputy for Minas Gerais, and rose to various important political and bureaucratic positions, both in state and federal governments.

He was a well-known poet and translator. A contemporary of Carlos Drummond de Andrade, his poetic work is closely associated with the Modernist movement. He was also a highly regarded translator of English, American, French, Spanish and German poets, with special expertise in Shakespeare.

He was the fifth occupant of Chair 12 of the Brazilian Academy of Letters, to which he was elected on August 1, 1968, succeeding Macedo Soares and received on May 23, 1969, by academician Deolindo Couto. He in turn received academicians Marcos Almir Madeira on November 19, 1993, and Celso Cunha on December 4, 1987. He presided over the Academia Brasileira de Letras in 1993.

Married to Inês Caldeira Brant Renault, he had two sons, Caio Márcio and Luiz Roberto and several grandchildren. He died in Rio de Janeiro on December 31, 1995.

References

1901 births
1995 deaths
Brazilian poets
People from Barbacena